The Windan Bridge is a six-lane road bridge in East Perth, Western Australia which crosses the Swan River and forms part of the Graham Farmer Freeway. Opened in 2000, it sits next to the Goongoongup railway bridge which was built in 1995.

A joint venture between Transfield and Thiess Contractors was selected to construct the bridge from a short-list of three parties. Construction began in 1998. A dual-use pedestrian/cycle pathway is located beneath the main deck.

The bridge is named after Windan, a wife of Yellagonga (sometimes spelt Yallgunga), chief of the Mooro tribe. Her body was buried around the area, according to her wish. The name was chosen in consultation with Noongar elders as part of the Graham Farmer Freeway project. A naming ceremony was held on 9 April 2000 where a plaque was unveiled and a traditional Aboriginal smoking ceremony performed.

The opening of the Graham Farmer Freeway and Windan Bridge was celebrated with a community open day on 22 April 2000 where the public could walk or cycle through the Graham Farmer tunnel and across the bridge. The freeway and bridge was open to traffic the following day.

The bridge is part of a popular exercise trail known as the Windan Bridge Loop, which goes along the banks of the Swan River and across the Windan Bridge and The Causeway.

References

External links
 

Bridges completed in 2000
Road bridges in Perth, Western Australia
Burswood, Western Australia
East Perth, Western Australia
Box girder bridges
Swan River (Western Australia)